Damir Čeković (Serbian Cyrillic: Дамир Чековић; born 19 March 1990 in Novi Sad) is a Serbian football player.

Career
He started his career in Žilina, then after an injury he moved to a lower division team, Novi Sad. In 2012 he moved to Proleter in the second division. In 2013 he made his move to Bačka Palanka, where he still plays.

References

External links
 Damir Čeković at srbijafudbal.net
 

1990 births
Living people
Footballers from Novi Sad
Serbian footballers
Association football forwards
RFK Novi Sad 1921 players
FK Proleter Novi Sad players
OFK Bačka players
Serbian First League players